The Black and Blue Bowl is the name given to the Memphis–Southern Miss football rivalry between the Tigers of the University of Memphis and the Golden Eagles of the University of Southern Mississippi.

History
The rivalry dates back to October 26, 1935. This yearly classic garnered its name from the intense competitive nature of the contest, as well as the competing schools' colors: the black of Southern Miss and the blue of Memphis. From 1995 to 2012, both teams were members of Conference USA in the Eastern Division. The series has been dormant since Memphis accepted an invitation to join the American Athletic Conference. The teams announced that they have scheduled a home-and-home football series for the 2027 and 2030 seasons.

Game results

See also  
 List of NCAA college football rivalry games

References

College football rivalries in the United States
Memphis Tigers football
Southern Miss Golden Eagles football